Eddie King (April 21, 1938 – March 14, 2012) was an American Chicago blues guitarist, singer and songwriter. Living Blues magazine stated that "King is a potent singer and player with a raw, gospel-tinged voice and an aggressive, thick-toned guitar sound". He was noted as creating a "straightforward style, after Freddie King and Little Milton".

Life and career
King was born Edward Lewis Davis Milton in Talladega, Alabama. His parents were both musical: his father played the guitar, and his mother was a gospel singer. King learned basic guitar riffs from watching from outside the window of local blues clubs. He was inspired by the playing of Muddy Waters, Howlin' Wolf, and Little Walter. He grew up playing alongside Luther Allison, Magic Sam, Junior Wells, Eddie C. Campbell, and Freddie King.

He relocated to Chicago in 1954, and his diminutive stature and the influence of B.B. King led to his being referred to as Little Eddie King. Given a break by Little Mack Simmons, he first recorded under the tutelage of Willie Dixon and, in 1960, played on several tracks recorded by Sonny Boy Williamson II. He also recorded with Detroit Junior. Also in 1960, King recorded a single, "Shakin' Inside" backed with "Love You Baby", released by J.O.B. Records. He then played guitar backing Koko Taylor, a role he undertook for two decades. He formed Eddie King & the Kingsmen in 1969. King moved to Peoria, Illinois, in the early 1980s. After the early 1990s, his backing ensemble was known as the Swamp Bees, and his music incorporated Chicago blues, country blues, blues shouter, and soul music.

His debut album, The Blues Has Got Me (1987), was issued by the Netherlands-based record label Black Magic and later re-released by Double Trouble. It featured one of his sisters, Mae Bee May, on vocals.

In 1997, King recorded Another Cow's Dead, which won a Blues Music Award for Best Comeback Blues Album. It was arranged by Lou Marini.

His songwriting credits include "Kitty Kat", described by one music journalist as "hilarious".

King died in Peoria on March 14, 2012, at the age of 73. In October 2012, the Killer Blues Headstone Project, a nonprofit organization, placed a headstone on his previously unmarked grave at the Lutheran Cemetery in Peoria.

Discography

With Sonny Boy Williamson
The Real Folk Blues (Chess, 1947-64 [1966])

See also
J.O.B. Records discography
List of Chicago blues musicians
List of electric blues musicians

References

External links
Discogs.com

1938 births
2012 deaths
Blues musicians from Alabama
American blues guitarists
American male guitarists
American blues singers
American male singers
Chicago blues musicians
Songwriters from Alabama
People from Talladega, Alabama
Songwriters from Illinois
Guitarists from Alabama
Guitarists from Illinois
20th-century American guitarists
20th-century American male musicians
American male songwriters